Schmogrow-Fehrow is a municipality in the district of Spree-Neiße, in Lower Lusatia, Brandenburg, Germany.

History
From 1815 to 1947, the constituent localities of Schmogrow-Fehrow were part of the Prussian Province of Brandenburg. From 1952 to 1990, they were part of the Bezirk Cottbus of East Germany. On 31 December 2001, the municipality of Schmogrow-Fehrow was formed by merging the municipalities of Schmogrow and Fehrow.

Demography

References

Populated places in Spree-Neiße